The Barrelhouse Club, at 107th and Wilmington in Watts, Los Angeles, was a rhythm and blues nightclub opened in 1948 and co-owned by Johnny Otis, and Bardu and Tila Ali.

It was named in honour of the Barrel House in Omaha, Nebraska, the first club in that district to welcome black and white customers.

Featured artists
Artists who performed at the venue included Mel Walker, Esther Phillips, who first performed there at a talent show, The Robins, The Hollywood Flames, and tenor saxophonist Big Jay McNeely. Many of the performers at the club would join Otis' California Rhythm and Blues Caravan in the early 1950s. Pete "Guitar" Lewis, who played with the Johnny Otis Orchestra between the late 1940s and mid-1950s, also recorded an instrumental, "Midnight in the Barrelhouse" (the flip-side, "Barrelhouse Stomp" was by McNeely), for the Excelsior record label, presumably in honor of the club.

References

African-American music
Nightclubs in Los Angeles County, California
Music venues completed in 1948
Music venues in Los Angeles
Watts, Los Angeles